Abdul-Monem Al-Mashat is an Egyptian political scientist and an expert on national security. He served on the Egyptian Embassy in Washington, D.C., in the World Bank, in the Institute of International Education, and in numerous academic positions, including as a director of several research institutions.

Biography

Al-Mashat obtained a BA and an MA in political science from Cairo University in 1970 and 1975 respectively. He earned his PhD from the University of North Carolina at Chapel Hill in 1982; the title of his thesis was "Considerations in the Analysis of National Security in the Third World".

His first academic work was published in 1977. Al-Mashat's publications cover topics such as national security, the Arab-Israeli conflict, foreign policy in the Arab world, Arabic culture, education reform, development in the Arab world, Arab security, U.S. foreign policy, and political development in the third world.

Al-Mashat's daughter, Rania Al-Mashat, has been Egypt's Minister of Tourism since January 2018.

Career

This is a list of posts that Abdul-Monem Al-Mashat has held during his career:
1974–1977 — Cairo University, Department of Political Science, assistant lecturer
1975 — Ștefan Gheorghiu Academy, Romania, participant in a seminar
1981–1982 — City University of New York, Images of Conflict Project, adjunct professor
1981–1985 — International Peace Research Association (IPRA), Executive Council, member
1982 — American Association for the Advancement of Science (AAAS), member
1982–1986, 1992–1995, and September 2005 – present — Cairo University, Department of Political Science, professor
1985–present — Government of Egypt, consultant
1985–present — Royal Institute of Strategic Studies, London, member
1985–present — Arab Political Science Association, member
1986–1992 — Al-Ain University, United Arab Emirates, Department of Political Science, professor
1987–present — Arab International Studies Association, member
1992–1993 — American University in Cairo, Department of Political Science, professor
1994–1995 — Cairo University, Faculty of Economics and Political Sciences (FEPS), dean
1995 – March 1998 — Embassy of Egypt; Washington, D.C.; Egyptian Cultural and Educational Bureau (ECEB); counselor and director
1997–present — Al-Hewar Center; Vienna, Virginia, U.S.; advisory board; member
March 1998 – August 2005 — World Bank, Washington D.C., Joint Japan/World Bank Graduate Scholarship Program (JJ/WBGSP) and Robert S. McNamara Fellowships Program (RSMFP), scholarships administrator
2000–2005 — Institute of International Education, Hubert Humphrey Fellowship Program, reviewing committee, member
2004 — Association of Egyptian-American Scholars, advisory board, member
2005 — Supreme Council of Culture, Egypt, member 
 — Future University, Egypt, faculty of economic and political science, dean
June 2006 – August 2008 — Cairo University, Center for Political Research and Studies, professor and director
December 2006 – present — Cairo Center for Civic Education and Development (CCCED), founder and CEO
2007–present — Supreme Administrative Court for Political Parties, First Circuit, member
2008–present — Economic and Political Science Accreditation and Quality Control National Commission, member
2009–present — Center for National Studies at National Council of Women, board of directors, member
February 2010 – present — Cairo Center for the Culture of Democracy, director

Awards

Al-Mashat has won a number of academic awards:
Citation of Stewardship and Commitment to Field of International Development from Harvard University (2002)
American Association for the Advancement of Science (AAAS) award to participate in the Annual Convention in Washington DC, January (1981)
University of North Carolina Graduate School Award to study American Policy in Washington (1978)
Nasser's Award for Excellence in High School Exam in Egypt (1965)

References

External links
 Interview with Dr. Abdul-Monem Al-Mashat on television (re-uploaded on YouTube)

Year of birth missing (living people)
Living people
Academic staff of The American University in Cairo
Cairo University alumni
City University of New York faculty
Egyptian diplomats
Egyptian political scientists
University of North Carolina at Chapel Hill alumni